U.S. Route 11 (US 11) in the U.S. state of Tennessee travels from the Georgia state line in Chattanooga to Knoxville, where it then splits into US 11E and US 11W. These two highways then travel to the Virginia state line near Kingsport and Bristol. During its length, it shares concurrencies with State Route 2 (SR 2) and SR 38.

Route description

US 11 enters Tennessee west of Chattanooga. While SR 38 terminates here, US 11 follows the highway east into downtown Chattanooga. At the intersection of Broad and West 20th streets, US 11 and US 64 separate from US 41 and US 72 and follow East 20th Street, which then curves to become East 23rd Street, east through downtown. The routes briefly overlap with US 41, here concurrent to US 76, on Dodds Avenue before resuming an easterly progression on Brainerd Road thereafter called Lee Highway.

East of downtown, I-24 terminates while I-75 continues east along the I-24 right-of-way. US 11 and US 64 continue to the northeast, through northern Chattanooga, and run concurrent with I-75 between exits 7 and 11. SR 317 runs concurrent with I-75 between exits 7 and 9. At exit 11, the route splits, running through Ooltewah and Collegedale before entering Bradley County. The route travels north to Cleveland and comes to an interchange with APD-40 (US 64 Bypass/US 74/SR 311). In downtown Cleveland, US 64 separates from US 11, following SR 40 east out of the city.

US 11 parallels I-75 as it heads north, passing through Athens, where it intersects with SR 30; Sweetwater, where it intersects SR 68; Loudon, where it intersects SR 72; and Lenoir City, where it intersects with US 321/SR 95. The route then forms a concurrency with US 70 (Kingston Pike) at Dixie Lee Junction and enters Knox County passing first through Farragut and then entering West Knoxville. The route comes to an intersection with SR 131 and then I-140 (Pellissippi Parkway). In Downtown Knoxville, the routes intersect with US 129. US 11 and US 70 split east of Knoxville, and split into US 11E and US 11W. US 11W goes through Rutledge, Bean Station, Rogersville, and Kingsport. US 11E goes through Jefferson City, Morristown, Russellville, Greeneville, Jonesborough, Johnson City, where the route forms a concurrency with US 19, and Bristol, before crossing into Virginia.

History

Cleveland to Charleston Concrete Highway

The longest segment of the original concrete US 11 located in Charleston was listed on the National Register of Historic Places (NRHP) on January 10, 2008, as the Cleveland to Charleston Concrete Highway. This segment, built from 1925 to 1927, now consists of Market and Water streets and runs from US 11 to the Hiwassee River where the original bridge was located.

Major intersections

See also
 
 
 Special routes of U.S. Route 11

References

External links

 Tennessee
11
Transportation in Hamilton County, Tennessee
Transportation in Bradley County, Tennessee
Transportation in McMinn County, Tennessee
Transportation in Monroe County, Tennessee
Transportation in Loudon County, Tennessee
Transportation in Knox County, Tennessee
Transportation in Sevier County, Tennessee
Transportation in Jefferson County, Tennessee
Transportation in Chattanooga, Tennessee
Transportation in Knoxville, Tennessee